Doc West is a 2009 Italian Western comedy film starring Terence Hill and Paul Sorvino.  It is a re-edited version of an Italian TV miniseries.

Plot

Minnesota "Doc" West (Terence Hill) is sending money (each bill marked with an "E") to a boarding school in Boston from a post office at Santa Fe, New Mexico. Immediately afterward, the post office is robbed by two bandits. He rides after them on his horse, but is stopped when he sees a boy named Silver (Benjamin Petry) fall off his horse spooked by a rattlesnake. West shoots the rattlesnake's rattler off and it retreats into the bushes, and diagnoses and fixes Silver's dislocated arm. Silver asks him if he's a doctor, but West denies it.

Silver tells West that the bandits headed for Holysand, the nearest town. They arrive in Holysand to witness a conflict between Silver's stepfather, rancher Nathan Mitchell (Boots Southerland) and rival rancher Victor Baker (Adam Taylor) over a large quantity of seed. The argument is broken up by Sheriff Roy Basehart (Paul Sorvino) and the local school teacher Denise Stark (Clare Carey).
Nathan's ranch hand, Garvey (Alessio di Clemente) orders Silver to clean it up.

West walks into the saloon, drawing the attention of the room, first as a stranger in town, and then by ordering tea rather than whiskey, which the patrons see as weakness. Garvey offers him a seat and a round of poker. West hustles Garvey, who accuses him of cheating, and challenges him to a duel. Basehart arrests West and locks him up and Garvey keeps West's money. News of West helping Silver spreads, and his reputation is further improved when he identifies the sheriff's boots as the source of his back pain.

The next morning Nathan's daughter, Millie (Mary Petruolo) who West met in the post office, arrives in Holysand and is greeted by her childhood friends Burt Baker (Micah Alberti) and Jack Baker (Linus Huffman). The sheriff has no more back pain due to his new boots. West also gives Stark a remedy to heal her sick friend. Millie reunites with her grandmother Melody, Nathan, and Silver. Nathan tells Jack and Burt to stay away from Millie because of his rivalry with their father. After a conversation with the sheriff, Nathan leaves but not before Silver gives West an apple pie (which they talked about earlier in the film).

West and the sheriff play a game of poker. After the sheriff wins, West tells him that he was a doctor, but he accidentally killed a patient while drunk. He also says that he takes care of her daughter, Estrella who he sends money to every month. He still continues to doctor, but vowed never to drink or touch a scalpel. The Baker brothers set the seed salesman Sam's (Harry Zimmerman) clothes on fire and are arrested, causing the town to laugh. West is released and with the help of Nathan, gets his money back from Garvey. Millie learns about Nathan's marriage to a woman named Dana, upsetting her. He also explains that the Bakers are their enemies, as they fight over a piece of land. Victor's barn mysteriously burns down. He blames Nathan and bails his sons out of jail.

In Santa Fe West is going to send money to Estrella and the bank teller declares they are all marked with "E" (for Estrella) and West realizes something. Meanwhile, Millie wants her father and Victor to get along and asks help from Stark. West tells the sheriff that Garvey gave him the stolen money, indicating that Garvey was one of the bandits in Santa Fe. West gets a room at the saloon and plans to stay until Garvey is behind bars. Millie talks with Burt and Jack and decide to keep their friendship a secret from their fathers.

Stark's dog, Big steals West's pan of beans and leads him to her house. He eventually lets Big have them and for the first time, the dog shows affection towards anyone. West and Stark have dinner and West retires. The next morning Millie thinks that Nathan burned down the Baker's barn and storms off. Nathan discovers that the water pump for his cattle is sabotaged, causing him to think Victor did it. Silver tells West that Garvey was not in Holysand the day of the robbery that he takes three days off every month. Victor challenges Nathan to a gunfight but West shoots the guns out of their hands. Garvey attempts to challenge West, but the sheriff stops him.

West decides to settle who claims the land by a boxing in the center of Holysand. Victor and Nathan refuse, but the sheriff reminds that blood will be spilled if they don't agree.
West teaches Burt and Jack along with their friend Larry exercise before boxing. Burt and Millie's friendship turns into a romance, causing Jack to be jealous. Burt can only kick but not box and Jack takes his anger out on the beanbag that they punch. Jack is so strong that a beam comes down and knocks West unconscious. Stark nurses West back to health and West continues training the Bakers. The sheriff tells West that every time Garvey took days off there were robberies, confirming Garvey was one of the thieves.

At the tournament there are no guns or eye-gouging allowed. The fight begins and the Bakers win.
Garvey sneaks off to his horse and reveals a stashed gun under his saddle. This reveals that Garvey burned Victor's barn down and sabotaged Nathan's water pump to cause conflict.
He puts on his gun belt and challenges West again to a gunfight. West shoots him and walks away. Garvey survives and tries to kill him, but Silver jumps in front of him and takes the bullet. West shoots and kills Garvey.

West refuses to do surgery after Estrella's mother died at his hands, but Stark encourages him to do so. Silver is saved and Nathan thanks him. West is self-awakened and he and Stark share a kiss. West leaves the next morning, but a Mexican farmer asks for help. His wife is in labor and is dying. Silver rides after him and West rolls his eyes.

References

External links
 

2009 films
English-language Italian films
Italian Western (genre) television series
Spaghetti Western television series
Spaghetti Western films
2000s Western (genre) comedy films
Films directed by Terence Hill
Films directed by Giulio Base
2009 comedy films
Films edited from television programs
2000s English-language films